Roland Bäckman (born 1960) is a Swedish politician and former member of the Riksdag, the national legislature. A member of the Social Democratic Party, he represented Gävleborg County between September 2007 and October 2010. He was also a substitute member of the Riksdag for Ulrica Messing in October 2006.

References

1960 births
Living people
Members of the Riksdag 2006–2010
Members of the Riksdag from the Social Democrats